The following is the standings of the Iran Football's 2nd Division 1977–78 football season.

League standings

See also 
 1977–78 Takht Jamshid Cup

League 2 (Iran) seasons
Iran
2